The Saint-Étienne tramway is a tram system in the city of Saint-Étienne in the Rhône-Alpes (France) that has functioned continuously since its opening in 1881. The CFVE took over the  lines and discontinued the use of steam in 1912.

Lines with small patronage were replaced by trolleybuses in 1932 with all but one line closed in 1956 as a result of the impossibility of running these buses on the busiest line of the network. The decision to keep the tramway in the 1950s saw the introduction of the famous PCC tramcars to replace 1932 rolling stock and the Vevey-Alsthom tramcars in 1991-1992. The system is operated by the STAS.

Network 

A line from Cinq-Chemins de Terre Noire to Saint-Jean-Bonnefonds opened in 1907 and closed on 1 April 1932 after being replaced by a bus service. Lines from the town centre to Le Pertuiset, Saint-Genest-Lerpt and Roche-la-Molière opened between 1907 and 1909.
A second line to supplement the main route opened in 2006 to serve the Chateaucreux station.

Tram carhouses 
The carhouse as well as the PCC streetcars were demolished.

It is the STAS depot for Saint-Étienne and houses buses, trolleybuses and trams.

Rolling stock 
Saint-Étienne tramway currently runs a fleet of 35 tramcars built by Vevey and Alstom, and 16 CAF Urbos. There have been four large fleets of tramcars to operate on the network, the largest being the fleet of PCC cars introduced in 1958.

Type A tramcars 
Type A tramcars were built by Grammont in 1897. The 28 cars circulated from 1897 to 1952, were 7.50 m long, 2 m wide and were capable of transporting 40 passengers.

Type H tramcars 
The Type H tramcars were introduced in 1907 at the start of the electric traction services. The cars were 10.21 m in length, 2 m wide, weighed 12.3 t (empty) and developed 100 hp (2 x 5t) hp. They were operated by a wattman and a receiver (ticket collector) and could carry 48 passengers. The cars lay on a Brill 79 Ex2 truck.

Type R tramcars 
Type R tramcars were built by the CGC of Saint-Denis in 1912. All eight of the cars circulated from 1912 to 1959 and were capable of carrying 47 passengers. The tramcars weighed 13 tonnes empty and were 9.35 m long and 2 m wide.

PCC tramcars 

The PCC streetcar fleet was composed of 30 single-car trams built in Strasbourg which were introduced in 1958 after the decision to keep the busiest tramway line was made, with the last one withdrawn in 1998.

PCC trams in preservation 
Société de Transports de l'Agglomération Stéphanoise still has 6 PCC streetcars:
 5 two-car PCC streetcars, numbered 551 to 555, awaiting a buyer;
 1 PCC streetcar, numbered 586, used for maintenance (unusual for having a pantograph instead of a trolley pole).

Alsthom-Vevey-Duewag articulated tramcars 
This class of tramcars, a variation of the Tramway Français Standard, exists in two types, tramcars introduced in 1991 and those in 1998. They are numbered 901 to 915 and have a seating capacity of 43. In 1998, more tramcars were introduced with only minor differences, numbered 916 to 935.

The first class of modern tramcars (15) was equipped with trolley poles since the PCC trams were still in use. These were subsequently replaced by pantographs as the PCC trams were withdrawn and the second group of modern cars was introduced.

The second class of Alsthom-Vevey tramcars (20) are capable of reaching a maximum speed of 70 km/h. They were built on 23.24 m long H chassis and have an empty weight of 27.4 tonnes. The electric current is conveyed by pantograph rather than the trolley poles used on the PCC trams. The current delivered is 600 V DC.

CAF Urbos

In order to replace and expand the fleet, in 2014 a €42m contract was signed with CAF for delivery of 16 Urbos trams. These were delivered between 2017 and 2018.

Network Map

See also 
 Trams in France
 List of town tramway systems in France

References

External links 

  

Saint Etienne
Transport in Saint-Étienne
Railway companies established in 1881
Saint Etienne
Railway lines in Auvergne-Rhône-Alpes
1881 establishments in France
600 V DC railway electrification
Saint Etienne